The Johns Hopkins University Department of Biomedical Engineering has both undergraduate and graduate biomedical engineering programs located at the Johns Hopkins University in Baltimore, Maryland.

Research is focused in the general areas of biomedical imaging, computational genomics, computational medicine, data intensive biomedical science, genomic-epigenomic engineering, neuroengineering, regenerative and immune engineering, systems biology, and medical technologies. The department offers several degrees including a Bachelor of Science in Biomedical Engineering, a Master of Science in Biomedical Engineering, a Master of Science in Bioengineering Innovation and Design, and a Doctor of Philosophy in Biomedical Engineering. Undergraduate degree offerings are administered at the Homewood campus of the university with the graduate degree programs co-located at both the Homewood and the East Baltimore campuses.

History
Biomedical engineering at Johns Hopkins was first established in 1961 as a Division of Biomedical Engineering within the Johns Hopkins University School of Medicine in East Baltimore with Samuel Talbot  as the head, followed by Richard J. Johns (1965-1991). In 1961, Johns Hopkins, along with the University of Pennsylvania and the University of Rochester, established the first graduate programs in biomedical engineering. Established in the School of Medicine, the program at Johns Hopkins is the oldest continually-funded PhD program in the nation. 

In 1981, Johns and David VandeLinde, then Dean of the Whiting School of Engineering, launched the undergraduate program at the Homewood campus; the first undergraduate program director was Eric D. Young. This is now the largest undergraduate program within the Whiting School of Engineering. The department continues to be shared jointly between the two schools.

Founding faculty
The original eight faculty members who founded the Department of Biomedical Engineering were specialists in neuroscience and the science of cardiovascular engineering. This founding era gave rise to some of the earliest works in computational neuroscience, exemplified by the application of control theory to the neural basis of eye movements, understanding the control of the strength of heart muscle contractions, Johns' articulation of what has come to be known as Systems Biology, the early neural codes of complex auditory stimuli forming the basis for modern cochlear implants, and somatosensory codes forming the basis for modern tactile prostheses.

The Whitaker Foundation Years
In 2000, Johns Hopkins University received an award from the Whitaker Foundation, enabling the hiring of 10 tenure line faculty with principal appointments in the Whiting School of Engineering. The department has since developed with the formation of several Centers of Excellence and Institutes including the Center for Imaging Science (CIS), the Center for Bioengineering Innovation and Design (CBID), and the Institute for Computational Medicine (ICM). During this period, the Johns Hopkins University Translational Tissue Engineering Center (TTEC) and the Carnegie Center for Surgical Innovation were developed, both residing on the School of Medicine campus.

With the Whitaker foundation award, the new Clark Hall was constructed at the Homewood campus.

Rankings
For 30 years, the Johns Hopkins Department of Biomedical Engineering was continuously ranked as the number one undergraduate and graduate Biomedical Engineering program in the United States by U.S. News & World Report. In 2017, it was ranked number one by U.S. News & World Report for its graduate program; the undergraduate program was ranked number two. In March 2018, U.S. News & World Report announced that the undergraduate program was again ranked number one.

Notable faculty
 Jennifer Elisseeff - member of the National Academy of Inventors
Andrew Feinberg (geneticist), Bloomberg Distinguished Professor - genomic engineering, systems biology, member of the American Academy of Arts and Sciences, the National Academy of Medicine, and the National Academy of Sciences
Taekjip Ha, Bloomberg Distinguished Professor - biomedical imaging, genetic engineering, mechanobiology, molecular-cell engineering, member of the American Academy of Arts and Sciences and the National Academy of Sciences
Michael I. Miller, Massey Professor and Director - biomedical analytics, biomedical imaging, computational medicine, neural engineering
Steven L Salzberg, Bloomberg Distinguished Professor - biomedical analytics, genomic engineering 
Sridevi V. Sarma, neural engineering, precision medicine, systems physiology
Jeffrey H. Siewerdsen, biomedical imaging, biomedical instrumentation, medical robotics, medical technology
Natalia Trayanova, Murray B. Sachs Professor - computational cardiology, precision medicine, heart rhythm disorders
Rene Vidal, biomedical analytics, biomedical imaging, computational medicine
Raimond L. Winslow, Raj and Neera Singh Professor - computational medicine, precision medicine, systems physiology
Wojtek Zbijewski, biomedical imaging, orthopaedics, translational medicine, biomedical analytics
Joshua Vogelstein, biomedical imaging, neuroscience, data science, machine learning, graph statistics
Kathleen E. Cullen - Multisensory integration, motor learning mechanisms, neural prosthesis, computational neuroscience

Other members of the National Academies on the faculty include
 Richard J. Johns - member of the National Academy of Medicine
 Murray B. Sachs - member of the National Academy of Engineering

References

External links
 Johns Hopkins University BME website 

Biomedical Engineering Department